Siv Nordrum (7 October 1958 – 24 April 2021) was a Norwegian journalist, communication director and politician.

Born in Drøbak, Nordrum worked as journalist from 1977, and was assigned with NRK in the 1980s and 1990s. At NRK she started working for the radio's main news programme Dagsnytt in 1984, and was a foreign correspondent for NRK in Asia from 1989.

From 2001 to 2005 she served as State Secretary at the Office of the Prime Minister, working with  Kjell Magne Bondevik.

From 2006 to 2012 she was appointed communication director at the University of Oslo, and from 2012 to 2015 she assumed a similar position for Statistics Norway, and from 2015 she was head of communications at the Storting.

Nordrum was married to Christian Syse, Norwegian ambassador to Sweden and the couple resided in Stockholm since 2017.

She died on 24 April 2021 after a short illness.

References

1958 births
2021 deaths
People from Frogn
Norwegian journalists
NRK people
Norwegian state secretaries
Christian Democratic Party (Norway) politicians